

Jaruman (or Jarumann; died 669) was the fourth Bishop of Mercia. He fought against apostasy outside his diocese. He served as bishop in the time of King Wulfhere of Mercia, on whose behalf he undertook several missions to Saxon tribes which had returned to paganism.  He probably originated in Ireland but was educated at Lindisfarne.

Some Tolkien scholars suggest that Jaruman's name was the inspiration for that of Saruman in The Lord of the Rings.

Citations

References

External links

Irish Christian missionaries
7th-century English bishops
Year of birth missing
669 deaths
7th-century Irish bishops
Anglo-Saxon bishops of Lichfield
Irish expatriates in England
Christian missionaries in England